Allenhurst is a borough in Monmouth County, in the U.S. state of New Jersey, named for resident Abner Allen and incorporated as a borough by an act of the New Jersey Legislature on April 26, 1897, from portions of Ocean Township. As of the 2010 United States Census, the borough's population was 496, reflecting a decline of 222 (−30.9%) from the 718 counted in the 2000 census, which had in turn declined by 41 (−5.4%) from the 759 counted in the 1990 census.

Bordered by the Atlantic Ocean to the east and Deal Lake to the west, it is in close proximity to New York City and is a stop on the NJ Transit North Jersey Coast Line. The borough is at the center of a string of wealthy communities between Long Branch and Asbury Park with many historic homes built during the late 19th and early 20th centuries. In 2006, Allenhurst ranked 131st in Forbes magazine's list of the most expensive ZIP Codes in the United States.

History
Allenhurst "reflects the history of development from a rural area to a suburb and resort town of New York City. In 1895, the  Allen farm was bought by the Coast Land Improvement Company in order to build an exclusive resort community to attract upper class summer residents. The proximity of Allenhurst to the rail line was significant in the growth and popularity of Allenhurst, allowing residents of New York City easier access to the community."

On April 26, 1897, Allenhurst was incorporated as a borough by an act of the New Jersey Legislature from portions of Ocean Township.  The borough is situated in the center of a string of wealthy communities between Long Branch and Asbury Park. The borough was named for resident Abner Allen.

During the late 19th and early 20th centuries many historic homes were built in Victorian, Queen Anne, Italian Renaissance Revival, Tudor Revival, Prairie, Mission Revival, American Craftsman, Shingle, Colonial Revival, Neoclassical and Gothic Revival architectural styles. Local ordinances overseen by an historic preservation commission have ensured the preservation of historical architecture by enforcing strict guidelines for the renovation of older homes.

In 2006, Allenhurst ranked 131st in Forbes magazine's list of the most expensive ZIP Codes in the United States. In the magazine's 2012 rankings, the borough was ranked 448th, with a median price of $665,043.

After Hurricane Sandy had devastated the shoreline in October 2012, the U.S. Army Corps of Engineers (USACE) in 2015 pumped sand onto the beaches, which contained unexploded ordnance in the form of hundreds of fusing components for World War I-era artillery. From December 2016 until March 2017, USACE Baltimore District specialists in munitions and explosives removed 362 chap-stick-sized potentially live pieces, mostly boosters, which had most likely been disposed of as excess after World War I, and are not uncommon at Gateway's Sandy Hook Unit. "Not only was Fort Hancock an active military base until 1974, but also the proving ground of the U.S. Army from 1874 until 1919."

Geography
According to the United States Census Bureau, the borough had a total area of 0.28 square miles (0.73 km2), including 0.25 square miles (0.65 km2) of land and 0.03 square miles (0.08 km2) of water (11.43%).

The borough borders the Atlantic Ocean to the east, Deal Lake to the west, and is in close proximity to New York City. The borough borders the Monmouth County municipalities of Deal, Interlaken, Loch Arbour and Ocean Township.

The beachfront is characterized by two groins, known to locals as "Crackup" and "The L".  "The L" was featured in Scuba Diving magazine as one of New Jersey's premier shore diving locations.

Demographics

Census 2010

The Census Bureau's 2006–2010 American Community Survey showed that (in 2010 inflation-adjusted dollars) median household income was $79,250 (with a margin of error of +/− $41,438) and the median family income was $131,500 (+/− $30,872). Males had a median income of $71,944 (+/− $75,722) versus $44,625 (+/− $3,762) for females. The per capita income for the borough was $63,707 (+/− $14,113). About 3.2% of families and 3.5% of the population were below the poverty line, including none of those under age 18 and 8.9% of those age 65 or over.

Census 2000

As of the 2000 United States census there were 718 people, 285 households, and 188 families residing in the borough. The population density was 2,750.6 people per square mile (1,066.2/km2). There were 370 housing units at an average density of 1,417.4 per square mile (549.5/km2). The racial makeup of the borough was 97.35% White, 0.84% African American, 0.28% Native American, 0.42% Asian, 0.14% from other races, and 0.97% from two or more races. Hispanic or Latino of any race were 2.51% of the population.

There were 285 households, out of which 23.9% had children under the age of 18 living with them, 55.8% were married couples living together, 6.7% had a female householder with no husband present, and 33.7% were non-families. 24.9% of all households were made up of individuals, and 7.0% had someone living alone who was 65 years of age or older. The average household size was 2.52 and the average family size was 3.08.

In the borough the population was spread out, with 28.9% under the age of 18, 5.7% from 18 to 24, 28.8% from 25 to 44, 27.9% from 45 to 64, and 18.7% who were 65 years of age or older. The median age was 42 years. For every 100 females, there were 106.3 males. For every 100 females age 18 and over, there were 96.0 males.

The median income for a household in the borough was $85,000, and the median income for a family was $109,180. Males had a median income of $70,625 versus $32,171 for females. The per capita income for the borough was $42,710. About 1.0% of families and 3.8% of the population were below the poverty line, including 1.6% of those under age 18 and 2.1% of those age 65 or over.

Parks and recreation
The Allenhurst Beach Club, a 2,450-member recreational facility, has attracted residents and visitors during the summer months for generations. As of 2013 it featured a  salt water swimming pool, a children's wading pool, cabanas and bathhouses.  New membership is no longer open to non-residents according to the borough administration.

Government

Local government
Since 1916, Allenhurst has been governed by a three-member Commission, under the terms of the Walsh Act. The borough is one of 30 municipalities (of the 564) statewide that use the commission form of government. The governing body is comprised of the three-member Board of Commissioners, whose members are elected at-large in non-partisan elections to serve four-year terms of office on a concurrent basis as part of the May municipal election. Each Commissioner is assigned responsibility for a specified department within the Borough; one of the commissioners is chosen to serve as mayor and another as deputy mayor.

, the members of Allenhurst's Board of Commissioners are Mayor David J. McLaughlin (Commissioner of Public Affairs and Public Safety), Deputy Mayor Christopher J. McLoughlin (Commissioner of Revenue and Finance) and Terry Bolan (Commissioner of Public Works, Parks and Public Property), all serving concurrent terms of office ending on May 21, 2024.

Federal, state and county representation
Allenhurst is located in the 6th Congressional district and is part of New Jersey's 11th state legislative district.

 

Monmouth County is governed by a Board of County Commissioners comprised of five members who are elected at-large to serve three year terms of office on a staggered basis, with either one or two seats up for election each year as part of the November general election. At an annual reorganization meeting held in the beginning of January, the board selects one of its members to serve as Director and another as Deputy Director. , Monmouth County's Commissioners are
Commissioner Director Thomas A. Arnone (R, Neptune City, term as commissioner and as director ends December 31, 2022), 
Commissioner Deputy Director Susan M. Kiley (R, Hazlet Township, term as commissioner ends December 31, 2024; term as deputy commissioner director ends 2022),
Lillian G. Burry (R, Colts Neck Township, 2023),
Nick DiRocco (R, Wall Township, 2022), and 
Ross F. Licitra (R, Marlboro Township, 2023). 
Constitutional officers elected on a countywide basis are
County clerk Christine Giordano Hanlon (R, 2025; Ocean Township), 
Sheriff Shaun Golden (R, 2022; Howell Township) and 
Surrogate Rosemarie D. Peters (R, 2026; Middletown Township).

Politics

In all 31 presidential elections since its date of incorporation, Allenhurst has voted for the Republican presidential candidate, with all but four candidates from 1900 to 1988 taking at least 60% of the vote. The best showing for a Republican is the 91.11% of the vote received by William McKinley in his 1900 re-election bid. The best result for a Democrat for president is the 45.02% of the vote received by Joe Biden in the 2020 US presidential election.

As of March 23, 2011, there were a total of 401 registered voters in Allenhurst, of which 72 (18.0%) were registered as Democrats, 124 (30.9%) were registered as Republicans and 205 (51.1%) were registered as Unaffiliated. There were no voters registered to other parties.

In the 2013 gubernatorial election, Republican Chris Christie received 82.6% of the vote (147 cast), ahead of Democrat Barbara Buono with 17.4% (31 votes), and other candidates receiving no votes, among the 180 ballots cast by the borough's 376 registered voters (2 ballots were spoiled), for a turnout of 47.9%. In the 2009 gubernatorial election, Republican Chris Christie received 72.6% of the vote (175 ballots cast), ahead of Democrat Jon Corzine with 19.5% (47 votes) and Independent Chris Daggett with 7.9% (19 votes) with no votes cast for other candidates, among the 241 ballots cast by the borough's 405 registered voters, yielding a 59.5% turnout.

Historic district

The Allenhurst Residential Historic District is a historic district roughly bounded by the Atlantic Ocean, Main Street, Cedar Avenue, Hume Street and Elberon Avenue. The district was added to the National Register of Historic Places on June 18, 2010, for its significance in architecture. It includes 412 contributing buildings.

Education

Allenhurst is a non-operating district that does not have any public school facilities of its own. Until the 2017–2018 school year, public school students from Allenhurst had exclusively attended the Asbury Park Public Schools in Asbury Park as part of a sending/receiving relationship. In July 2017, the Acting Commissioner of the New Jersey Department of Education authorized the termination of the agreement with Asbury Park, which was replaced with a new relationship with the West Long Branch district for grades K–8 and with Shore Regional for grades 9–12.

The West Long Branch Public Schools serves students in pre-kindergarten through eighth grade from West Long Branch. Students from Interlaken and Loch Arbour also attend the district's school as part of sending/receiving relationships, in which students attend on a tuition basis. As of the 2018–2019 school year, the district, comprised of two schools, had an enrollment of 573 students and 62.4 classroom teachers (on an FTE basis), for a student–teacher ratio of 9.2:1. Schools in the district (with 2018–2019 enrollment data from the National Center for Education Statistics) are 
Betty McElmon Elementary School with 310 students in pre-Kindergarten through fourth grade and 
Frank Antonides School with 256 students in fifth through eighth grades.

For ninth through twelfth grades, public school students attend Shore Regional High School, a regional high school located in West Long Branch that also serves students from the constituent districts of Monmouth Beach, Oceanport and Sea Bright. The high school is part of the Shore Regional High School District. As of the 2018–2019 school year, the high school had an enrollment of 649 students and 57.2 classroom teachers (on an FTE basis), for a student–teacher ratio of 11.3:1.

Students also have the option to attend Academy Charter High School in Lake Como, which accepts students on a lottery basis from the communities of Allenhurst, Asbury Park, Avon-by-the-Sea, Belmar, Bradley Beach, Deal, Interlaken and Lake Como.

Transportation

Roads and highways

New Jersey Route 71 is the only significant highway in Allenhurst.

Public transportation
NJ Transit train service is offered from the Allenhurst station on the North Jersey Coast Line, providing service to Newark Penn Station, Secaucus Junction and New York Penn Station, as well as Hoboken Terminal. The station has been listed on the National Register of Historic Places since 1980.

New Jersey Transit offers local bus transportation on the 837 route.

Climate

According to the Köppen climate classification system, Allenhurst has a humid subtropical climate (Cfa). Cfa climates are characterized by all months having an average temperature > , at least four months with an average temperature ≥ , at least one month with an average temperature ≥  and no significant precipitation difference between seasons. Although most summer days are slightly humid with a cooling afternoon sea breeze in Allenhurst, episodes of heat and high humidity can occur with heat index values > . July is the peak in thunderstorm activity and the average wettest month is August. Episodes of extreme cold and wind can occur with wind chill values < .

Ecology

According to the A. W. Kuchler U.S. potential natural vegetation types, Allenhurst would have a dominant vegetation type of Appalachian oak (104) with a dominant vegetation form of eastern hardwood forest (25). The average date of first spring leaf-out is March 24 and fall color typically peaks in early-November.

Notable people

People who were born in, residents of, or otherwise closely associated with Allenhurst include:

 Bob Considine (1906–1975), author and columnist for William Randolph Hearst's Newspapers, had a garage in Allenhurst
 Dorothy Fields (1905–1974), librettist and lyricist, born in Allenhurst
 Abram Fitkin (1878–1933), investment banker, utilities operator and philanthropist who owned Milestones at 16-18 Corlies Avenue
 Alice Joyce (1890–1955), film actress known as The Madonna of the Screen had a summer home in Allenhurst
 Hoddy Mahon (1932-2011), head coach of the Seton Hall Pirates men's basketball team during the 1981–1982 season
 Al Meyers (1908–1976), pioneer aviator who founded Meyers Aircraft Company
 Gloria Monty (1921–2006), television producer best known for her work in the field of soap operas, most notably her tenure at General Hospital
 James B. Murray (1920–2015), businessman and politician who served in the Virginia House of Delegates

References

External links

 

 
1897 establishments in New Jersey
Boroughs in Monmouth County, New Jersey
Jersey Shore communities in Monmouth County
New Jersey District Factor Group none
Populated places established in 1897
Walsh Act
National Register of Historic Places in Monmouth County, New Jersey
Historic districts on the National Register of Historic Places in New Jersey
New Jersey Register of Historic Places